Scutus unguis, common name the northern duck's bill, is a species of large sea snail or limpet, a marine gastropod mollusk in the family Fissurellidae, the keyhole limpets and slit limpets.

Description
The length of the shell attains 25.7 mm.

White shell, up to 6 cm long, distinctive by absence of slit or apical hole, though there is a small indent in the posterior margin. The mantle has purple brown markings on a cream background. Habitat: shallow-water rocks and coral. (Richmond, 1997)

Distribution
This marine species occurs in the Indo-west Pacific, from the Red Sea to the Solomon Islands; also off Papua New Guinea and Australia (Northern Territory, Queensland, Western Australia).

References

 Blainville, M.H. de 1817. Sur la Patelle allongée de Chemnitz. Bulletin des Sciences, par la Société Philomathique de Paris 1817: 25–28
 Allan, J.K. 1950. Australian shells: with related animals living in the sea, in freshwater and on the land. Melbourne : Georgian House xix, 470 pp., 45 pls, 112 text figs.
 Knudsen J. (1992). Preliminary list of common marine prosobranch gastropods (Mollusca) from Hoi Ha Wan. In: Morton B, editor. Proceedings of the Fourth International Marine Biological Workshop: The Marine Flora and Fauna of Hong Kong and Southern China. The marine flora and fauna of Hong Kong and southern China III. Hong Kong University Press, Hong Kong. 2: pp 919–921
 Abbott, R. T. & Dance, S. P. (1986). Compendium of sea shells. American Malacologists, Inc: Melbourne, Florida
  Jarrett, A.G. (2000) Marine Shells of the Seychelles. Carole Green Publishing, Cambridge, xiv + 149 pp. NIZT 682
 Kilburn, R.N. & Rippey, E. (1982) Sea Shells of Southern Africa. Macmillan South Africa, Johannesburg, xi + 249 pp.
 Kilburn, R. N. (1978). The Emarginulinae (Mollusca: Gastropoda: Fissurellidae) of southern Africa and Mozambique. Annals of the Natal Museum. 23(2): 431–454.
 Herbert D.G. (1987) Taxonomic studies on the Emarginulinae (Mollusca: Gastropoda: Fissurellidae) of southern Africa and Mozambique. Hemitoma, Clypidina, Tugali, Scutus, Zeidora and two species of Emarginula. South African Journal of Zoology 22(1): 1–13. 
 Drivas, J. & Jay, M. (1987). Coquillages de La Réunion et de l'Île Maurice. Collection Les Beautés de la Nature. Delachaux et Niestlé: Neuchâtel. ISBN 2-603-00654-1. 159 pp. 
 Fowler, O. (2016). Seashells of the Kenya coast. ConchBooks: Harxheim. Pp. 1–170.

External links
  Linnaeus, C. (1758). Systema Naturae per regna tria naturae, secundum classes, ordines, genera, species, cum characteribus, differentiis, synonymis, locis. Editio decima, reformata [10th revised edition], vol. 1: 824 pp. Laurentius Salvius: Holmiae
 Reeve, L. A. (1841–1842). Conchologia Systematica, or complete system of conchology; in which the Lepades and conchiferous Mollusca are described and classified according to their natural organization and habits. Longman, Brown, Green, & Longman's, London.
  Adams, A. (1853). A monograph of Scutus, a genus of gasteropodous Mollusca belonging to the family Fissurellidae. Proceedings of the Zoological Society of London. 19
  Herbert D.G. (2015). An annotated catalogue and bibliography of the taxonomy, synonymy and distribution of the Recent Vetigastropoda of South Africa (Mollusca). Zootaxa. 4049(1): 1–98
 

Fissurellidae
Gastropods described in 1758
Taxa named by Carl Linnaeus